Hokmabad Rural District is a rural district (dehestan) in Atamalek District, Jowayin County, Razavi Khorasan Province, Iran. At the 2006 census, its population was 11,938, in 3,077 families.  The rural district has 11 villages.

References 

Rural Districts of Razavi Khorasan Province
Joveyn County